The Moutohora Branch was a branch line railway that formed part of New Zealand's national rail network in Poverty Bay in the North Island of New Zealand.  The branch ran for 78 km approximately North-West from Gisborne into the rugged and steep Raukumara Range to the terminus at Moutohora. Construction started in 1900, and the line was opened to Moutohora on 26 November 1917.

Built to the New Zealand standard  gauge the line was originally intended to become part of a railway to Auckland via Rotorua, and later as part of an East Coast Main Trunk Railway running from Gisborne to Pokeno by way of Ōpōtiki, Taneatua, Tauranga, and Paeroa. This comprehensive scheme never came to pass, and the branch line it subsequently became was closed in March 1959.

The branch had four names during its lifetime. Initially, it was authorised as a Gisborne to Rotorua line and labelled as such in the Public Works Statement until 1910. From then, while isolated from the rest of the NZR system, it was known as the Gisborne section (later the Palmerston North–Gisborne Line) of the NZR. Once Gisborne was linked to the rest of the NZR network in 1942 the line became the Motuhora Branch, to be renamed the Moutohora Branch in 1952, when the New Zealand Geographic Board decided on this spelling for the line's terminal locality.

Construction
The first report on proposals to link Gisborne and the rest of Poverty Bay to the outside world by rail was made in 1886, but nothing eventuated at that time. In April 1897  the East Coast Railway League was established to press for the development of rail connections, and in 1899 the Government announced that Gisborne was to be connected to Auckland by a line of rail. Work on the line started in early 1900. On 14 January the then Minister for Railways, the Joseph Ward, turned the first sod. The first  of the line ran across coastal plains with few obstacles, and the line was opened to Kaitaratahi on 10 November 1902. An eventual connection to the Rotorua Branch disappeared after a 1911 survey to connect the "Gisborne Section" with the East Coast Main Trunk.

Once past this point the line required large river bridging works, four tunnels, heavy earthworks and the construction of two large viaducts 18 and 30 metres high; in 1910 Massey Bros (Auckland engineers from 1901 to 1913) won a £3,002 contract for steel girders for the Gisborne-Rotorua Railway on the Otoko to Rakauroa section. Much of the line was built on steep grades of up to 1 in 30, and many tight curves were required.  Despite all earthworks being carried out by pick and shovel, and although hindered at times by floods, washouts and landslips and (in the later stages) a wartime shortage of materials, progress continued at a slow but steady pace, and the line was opened to Moutohora at 78.5 km by 26 November 1917.

Once at Moutohora, even though over the main divide, there was no easy way for the railway to link up with the rest of the NZR network, as a definitive line for a connection to the Bay of Plenty had never been identified. By 1920, 13 separate surveys had sought a practical route, but the expensive nature of the works required to provide a descent to the Bay of Plenty always deterred politicians from authorising any further extension of the line. In his annual report to parliament in 1916, the Minister of Public Works, William Fraser stated "Construction beyond the Kowhai Road [Moutuhora] Station cannot be put in hand until the route of the mainline towards the Bay of Plenty is definitely located." With the completion of the branch to Moutohora in 1917, construction workers were almost immediately transferred from Moutohora to Ngatapa to continue work on the line south. In 1924, with the Napier - Wairoa section of the Palmerston North - Gisborne Line was under construction and a short section between Wairoa and Waikokopu had been completed; it was decided that year to extend the line from Waikokopu to Gisborne via the coast rather than the longer inland route to Ngatapa. With the passing of time it became clear that Gisborne would be connected to the rest of the NZR system via this coastal route. This line south was finally completed and opened for traffic in 1942.

There was briefly interest in reviving a connection when the East Coast Main Trunk reached Taneatua in 1928. A new survey was undertaken by local surveying firm Grant and Cooke, proposing the new line leave the branch south of Matawai, crossing a saddle near Te Wera and then following the Koranga and Wairata streams to the Waioeka Valley down to the Bay of Plenty via Opotiki, and then on to Taneatua. The Great Depression following the Wall Street Crash of 1929 saw this scheme shelved.

Operations

Until connected with the Palmerston North – Gisborne Line in 1942 the Moutohora branch served a purely local function in maintaining access to Gisborne's hinterland. The line had heavy traffic in its early years and consistently showed an operating profit In the 12 months between April 1903 and March 1904, when only about 21 km of line were open, the approximately 6,500 people in the district made 47,706 single or return passenger journeys, and 4,464 tonnes of freight were carried.

In 1919-1920, with the full length of the line in operation, over 30,000 tonnes of freight were carried. Road metal from a quarry at Moutohora accounted for 16,400 tonnes of the 1919-1920 total, and continued to be a major component of all freight traffic in following years. Much of the rest of the 1919-1920 freight was timber cut from the extensive forests to which the line provided access. In the same year over 113,000 passenger journeys were recorded, the passenger traffic being sufficient to support a privately leased refreshment room at Te Karaka station. Apart from occasional passenger excursion trains all trains were mixed, carrying both passengers and freight.

By 1930 most of the economically accessible timber had been cut out and sawmills along the line  began closing down. Road metal and livestock continued to provide reasonably large tonnages, but with the onset of the depression both passenger and freight operations fell away, with only a small fraction of the district's primary produce being exported.

Even when economic conditions improved rail traffic did not recover to pre-depression levels until the imposition of road traffic restrictions and petrol rationing during the 1939-1945 war years.  In August 1942 the Moutohora branch was connected to the rest of the NZR network via the Palmerston North – Gisborne Line, causing a temporary increase to nearly 70,000 passenger journeys on the branch in the 1942-1943 year. After 1944, and the partial easing of some road transport restrictions, passenger numbers and freight fell away dramatically. Because of the combination of reduced passenger numbers and wartime coal shortages, passenger services were withdrawn from the branch on 29 January 1945. They were replaced by a 24-seat New Zealand Railways Road Services bus.

Motive power and train working
For the first seven years from 1902 two D class 2-4-0T locomotives provided all the motive power required for both construction and running services. In 1909 they were supplemented by an FA class 0-6-2T, and in 1910 the first of six WA class 2-6-2T engines arrived, with the two D class locomotives being shipped away at about the same time. As the FA class locos aged they were themselves replaced by WW class 4-6-4Ts and BB class 4-8-0 locomotives. Finally in 1952 AB class 4-6-2 Pacifics were introduced. The large tender on the ABs limited visibility when running backwards, so to ensure the line could be worked safely by these more powerful engines NZR installed a turning triangle at Moutohora station. Previous to this all engines had run smokebox first towards Moutohora and bunker first on their return.

Despite the heavy gradients train working was not as difficult as may have been expected. Most of the uphill traffic comprised empty wagons being sent to transport the district's primary produce back to Gisborne. The heavy downhill trains required more braking power than tractive effort, and special train management rules were in place to ensure a safe descent into Poverty Bay.

Closure

As freight volumes continued to decrease the viability of the branch came into question, particularly as it was now clear the connection with the Bay of Plenty would never be made.  In 1952 a Royal Commission was appointed to look into the profitability of branch lines, including the Moutohora branch.  The Commission sanctioned the retention of the branch for the time being, but made it clear to the local citizens that it was a case of "use it or lose it."

The development of aerial topdressing led to a short-term increase in freight traffic towards the middle of 1952, as large volumes of superphosphate were required in the district. This did not last and after lingering on for a few more years the end came in 1959, by which time keeping the line open cost more than three times its annual revenue. Despite the activities of a Railway Promotion League persisting into the 1950s to have the line extended to Taneatua, the branch officially closed on 14 March 1959. The last working train ran a month later, on 14 April, bringing out a final load of road metal for highway improvements that would use the railway alignment once the rails had been lifted.

Today
Five kilometres of the Moutohora branch remain open to Makaraka, functioning as an industrial siding to service a fruit storehouse. Many remains of the embankments, cuttings, bridge abutments and tunnels can be seen from State Highway 2 from near Ormond to Matawai. About 5 km of the old roadbed is now the Otoko recreational walkway. Just past the northern end of the walkway, the abutments and one of the steel piers of the 30m high Otoko viaduct are clearly visible to the east of the highway. Between Otoko and Rakauora the current highway runs largely on the old railway alignment, and the piers of the Rakauora viaduct still stand about 100m to the west of the highway just before reaching Rakauora. The  Matawhai station platform edge can be seen alongside the Matawai-Moutohora road, and the Motu river bridge truss remains in situ. Some railway buildings remain at various places up and down the old line, but there are now no railway remains left at the site of the Moutohora terminus.

Locomotive D 143, one of the two D class locomotives to work on the line in the first few years, has survived and is now in preservation at the Silver Stream Heritage Railway at Silverstream in the Hutt Valley near Wellington.

Locomotive WA 165, which arrived in 1911 to work the Gisborne section (as it was then) has also survived in preservation. Now owned by the Gisborne City Vintage Railway Incorporated, it has been returned to running order and is regularly steamed to provide excursions.

See also
Palmerston North–Gisborne Line
Ahuriri / Napier Port Branch
Nagtapa Branch

References

Citations

Bibliography

External links
 Information about the Otoko walkway, which follows part of the old roadbed Department of Conservation
 Silver Stream Railway 'D' class history
 Gisborne City Vintage Railway Inc. information about Wa165
 Remnants of the Moutohora Branch Today
 Photo of train at Karaka in 1909, at Otoko in 1910 and at Matawai in 1913
Photos of construction work in 1912
Photo of first train at Motuhora in 1917

Railway lines in New Zealand
Railway lines opened in 1917
Railway lines closed in 1959
Rail transport in the Gisborne District
1917 establishments in New Zealand
1959 disestablishments in New Zealand
3 ft 6 in gauge railways in New Zealand
Closed railway lines in New Zealand